Maria Foka (1 October 1916 - 15 June 2001) was a Greek actress and participated in character roles.

She was married to Lykourgos Kallergis.  Her final role was Olga in the Mega Channel series Dolce Vita.
She died in London in 2001, after years of heart problems and is buried in Bournemouth (though some sources say Portsmouth).

Selected filmography

Television

References

External links

1917 births
2001 deaths
Greek actresses
People from Argostoli
Greek expatriates in the United Kingdom